Parzatumar is a Classical Armenian book. It is the second published book in the Armenian language. The book was written by Hakob Meghapart in 1513. It is a liturgical calendar and a synaxaria.   

A copy is held by the National Library of Armenia. That copy is bound with a copy of the first book published in Armenian, Urbatagirk.

References

Armenian books
Printing
1513 books